The Bian River or Mbian River is a river of western part of Papua, in the province of Papua, Indonesia. Its total length is 580.6 km and width around 70 – 1447.1 m. Some 900 people in its upper course are said to speak the language Bian Marind.

Geography
The river flows in the southern area of Papua with predominantly tropical rainforest climate (designated as Af in the Köppen-Geiger climate classification). The annual average temperature in the area is 23 °C. The warmest month is October, when the average temperature is around 25 °C, and the coldest is June, at 20 °C. The average annual rainfall is 2952 mm. The wettest month is May, with an average of 405 mm rainfall, and the driest is August, with 62 mm rainfall.

Ecology 
In the district of Muting (Merauke Regency), the Bian River is a nature reserve by the order of the Ministry of Forestry as the habitat of various protected flora and fauna, among others: Archerfish and Asian arowana.

See also
List of rivers of Indonesia
List of rivers of Western New Guinea

References

Rivers of Papua (province)
Rivers of Indonesia